Riversdale is a settlement in Jamaica. It has a population of 4,408 as of 2009.

References

Populated places in Saint Catherine Parish

Riversdale is home to Jamaica's first Seventh-day Adventist college- West Indian Training College.The college was later relocated to Mandeville, Manchester. Today,on the ground where the college used to be, stands the Riversdale Seventh-day Adventist Church.

Of interest is the Natural Bridge which is the east exit of the town. Folklore says it just happened, because there is no trace of workmanship, and it is like a hole in a large boulder.